Whites Creek Historic District is a historic neighborhood in Whites Creek, Tennessee. It was listed on the National Register of Historic Places listings in Davidson County, Tennessee (NRHP) in 1984.

History
Located in  northwestern Davidson County the area's buildings were built from the 1830s to the early 1900s. Frederick Stump and Jesse James lived in Whites Creek. The Frederick Stump House is in Whites Creek. In 2015 the district was added to an annual historic-endangered list by The Tennessean newspaper: "Historic Nashville lists nine threatened properties". 

It was added to the National Register of Historic Places listings in Davidson County, Tennessee on July 18, 1980.

References

1830s establishments in Tennessee
National Register of Historic Places in Nashville, Tennessee
Historic districts on the National Register of Historic Places in Tennessee
Neighborhoods in Nashville, Tennessee
Populated places in Davidson County, Tennessee
Geography of Nashville, Tennessee
Tourist attractions in Tennessee
Tourist attractions in Nashville, Tennessee